A pièce montée (pronounced ; from French, literally "assembled piece" or "mounted piece", plural pièces montées) is a kind of decorative confectionery centerpiece in an architectural or sculptural form used for formal banquets and made of such ingredients as "confectioner’s paste" (also known as pâté d'office), nougat, marzipan, and spun sugar. Although the ingredients are typically edible, their purpose is mainly decorative, and they are often not meant to be consumed. They are associated with classical French chefs, such as Carême. Carême had studied architecture, and is credited with saying, referring to pièces montées, that architecture is the most noble of the arts, and pastry the highest form of architecture.

The term pièce montée is sometimes used to refer to the dessert also known as croquembouche, an assemblage of choux pastry profiteroles (or occasionally other kinds of pastry) stuck together with caramel or with spun sugar into a tall, usually conical shape. Unlike the type of pièce montée described above, it is meant to be eaten; in France, traditionally it is served at parties that celebrate weddings and baptisms.

See also 
 Entremet

References

Further reading
Larousse Gastronomique (English translation), by Prosper Montagné, 1961 Crown Publishers, page 732.

French desserts